Smith Inlet may refer to:

 Smith Inlet (Palmer Land), Antarctica
 Smith Inlet (Victoria Land), Antarctica
 Smith Inlet (British Columbia), Canada